Irina Kaarina Krohn (born July 10, 1962) is a Finnish politician and a former member of Finnish Parliament, representing the Green League. She is also member of the city council of Helsinki and has held positions in various other organisations. She was first elected to the parliament in 1995. She was a substitute member of the Parliamentary Assembly of the Council of Europe and a member of the Sub-Committees on Sustainable Development and Population.

In December 2005, Krohn was appointed the new managing director of the Finnish Film Foundation; she was succeeded in the Parliament by another Green from Helsinki, Johanna Sumuvuori.

Krohn was born in Helsinki, Finland. She has a master's from the Theatre Academy of Finland. Krohn was married 18 years to the movie director Wille Mäkelä. They have two children, Rudolf (b. 1993) and Frida (b. 1997). Krohn is the niece of the Finnish author and journalist Kaarina Goldberg.

References

External links
 The official website of Irina Krohn (in Finnish)
 Council of Europe
 

1962 births
Living people
Politicians from Helsinki
Finnish people of German descent
Green League politicians
Members of the Parliament of Finland (1995–99)
Members of the Parliament of Finland (1999–2003)
Members of the Parliament of Finland (2003–07)
Women members of the Parliament of Finland
21st-century Finnish women politicians